Pinkfong (Hangul: 핑크퐁) is a South Korean children's educational brand of The Pinkfong Company (formerly SmartStudy), a South Korean educational entertainment company. Pinkfong consists mainly of children's songs, the most famous of which is "Baby Shark.” The dance video associated with the song eventually became a viral YouTube video with just over 12 billion views (12.1B) as of January 2023. Their educational channel consists of stories, sing-along songs and dances represented by a pink fox named "Pinkfong". The global product development company has more than 4,000 children's videos, songs, games and apps.

History

Formation
Pinkfong was formed with the inception of SmartStudy at their Seoul headquarters, in June 2010. There are also supplementary headquarters in Los Angeles, U.S. and Shanghai, China. The U.S. branch's CEO Bin Jeong said the name was created from the pink fox character, and the fun sound of "fong" that sounded similar to "phone". The focus is for children ages 1-5. By 2015, the company had released 520 mobile apps with central base apps like "Pinkfong Nursery Rhymes". 

SmartStudy's CFO and co-founder Lee Ryan Seung-kyu said typical nursery rhymes were usually "slow and calm" so they began with a small project, searching for a more upbeat song "for the new generation" that would appeal globally. The "Pinkfong! Kids' Songs & Stories" YouTube channel was launched on December 13, 2011, with the brand character, a pink or magenta-colored animated cartoon fox, a Prince from the planet Staria, that was inspired by the fox in the classic French book The Little Prince by Antoine de Saint-Exupéry.
In late 2017, Hogi the green-colored hedgehog was introduced. In 2021, Ninimo the yellow-colored cat with a Disney Tsum Tsum-like toy was introduced. In mid 2022, Bebefinn the baby boy human was introduced.

YouTube channel
The YouTube channel videos include preschool songs that have learning value, rhymes and stories that incorporate the use of colors, numbers and letters. Song lyrics are repetitive, animation is bright and bold, and they run about one to two minutes in length. Some are grouped in video compilations, like "Planet Songs" and "Christmas Carols", and in addition to animation, some include claymation and child actors. The short length was made to accommodate cell phone views on both YouTube and SmartStudy's education mobile apps. Three of their most popular videos are "Baby Shark", "Police Car" and "The Lion." The receptiveness of children watching "Baby Shark" was shown in a YouTube video of an elementary school class of 55 students in Xi'an, China, posted by their English teacher, Frenchman Florian Marquette, in late 2015. He said the first time they saw it they responded with surprised expressions, then immediately started singing.

Pinkfong Wonderstar
Pinkfong Wonderstar is a YouTube Originals video series with two main characters: Pinkfong and Hogi. The two are magical friends that live in Wonderville. The two help Wonderville villagers that are in need of help. Key locations in the village are: Hogi's House, their Wonderstar tree shack, and Myan's House. The first episode was aired on June 27, 2019, on the KBS2 Korean Broadcasting System.

References

External links

 

South Korean brands
Children's mass media
YouTube channels launched in 2010
Education-related YouTube channels
Fictional foxes
Fictional extraterrestrial characters
Mass media companies established in 2010